The 2016 South Lakeland District Council election took place on 5 May 2016 to elect members of South Lakeland District Council in England. This was on the same day as other local elections.

This result had the following consequences for the total number of seats on the Council after the elections:

Election results summary

Ward results

An asterisk * indicates an incumbent seeking re-election.

Arnside & Beetham

Burton & Holme

Coniston & Crake Valley

Crooklands

Hawkshead

Levens

Lyth Valley

Milnthorpe

Sedbergh & Kirkby Lonsdale

Staveley-in-Cartmel

Staveley-in-Westmorland

Ulverston Central

Ulverston East

Ulverston North

Ulverston South

Ulverston Town

Ulverston West

By-Elections

References

2016 English local elections
2016
2010s in Cumbria